Stuart Milligan is a South African international lawn bowler.

Bowls career
In 2009 he won the triples and fours gold medals at the Atlantic Bowls Championships.

References

Living people
South African male bowls players
Year of birth missing (living people)